The 1939–40 FAW Welsh Cup is the 59th season of the annual knockout tournament for competitive football teams in Wales.

Key
League name pointed after clubs name.
B&DL - Birmingham & District League
FL D2 - Football League Second Division
FL D3N - Football League Third Division North

Fourth round
Eight winners from the Third round plus 18 new clubs.

Fifth round
Ten winners from the Fourth round. Cardiff City, Chester and Southport get a bye to the Sixth round.

Sixth round
Five winners from the Fifth round plus Cardiff City, Chester and Southport.

Semifinal
Replay between Wellington Town and New Brighton were held at Shrewsbury.

Final
Final were held at Shrewsbury.

External links
The FAW Welsh Cup

1939-40
Wales
Cup